

 
Zanda County or Tsamda County is a county in the Ngari Prefecture to the extreme west of the Tibet Autonomous Region of China. Its seat of power is at Tholing, the former capital of the Guge kingdom.

Zanda or Tsamda is said to mean “a place where there is grass downstream”, an allusion to the grassy river bed of the Sutlej river that flows through the county. Ancient Zanda horse (Hipparion zandaense) skeletons have been found in Zanda County's Sutlej basin. 

Zanda County is bounded by India's Himachal Pradesh state to the west, Uttarakhand State to the south, Ladakh to the northwest, Gar County to the northeast and Burang County to the southeast.

See also
 Tsaparang
 Chepzi

References

Further reading

External links
 Sutlej river flowing through the Zanda County, OpenStreetMap, retrieved 20 July 2021.

Counties of Tibet
Ngari Prefecture